Anthony Cox (born 26 August 2000) is a Jamaican sprinter. He represented Jamaica at the 2022 World Athletics Championships, competing in 4 × 400 metres relay.

References

External links
 

2000 births
Living people
Jamaican male sprinters
Place of birth missing (living people)
World Athletics Championships athletes for Jamaica
20th-century Jamaican people
21st-century Jamaican people